Palatucci is an Italian surname. Notable people with the surname include:

Bill Palatucci (born 1958), American lawyer and political consultant
Giovanni Palatucci (1909–1945), Italian police official

Italian-language surnames